A Killer Walks is a 1952 British film noir directed by Ronald Drake and starring Laurence Harvey, Trader Faulkner and Susan Shaw.

Plot 
This is a story about two brothers, Ned (Laurence Harvey) and Frankie (Trader Faulkner), living on a farm with their old grandmother. Ned despises being a farm labourer and befriends a girl from the city. She does not like a farm life either and dreams of having her own hair saloon.

Frankie is a somnambulist and one night he kills a bull with his gun. He also has many knives. This gives Ned a frightening idea: What if he stabs his grandmother with a knife and blame Frankie for the murder? Then he will be the owner of the farm and buy a hair saloon to his beloved one.

Cast
Susan Shaw as Joan Gray
Laurence Harvey as	Ned Harsten
Trader Faulkner as	Frankie Harsten
Laurence Naismith as Doctor James
Sheila Shand Gibbs as Brenda
Ethel Edwards as	Gran Elizabeth
Valentine Dunn as	Brenda's mother
Madge Brindley as Mrs. Ramble
John Ainsworth as Tony

References

External links

1952 films
1952 crime films
British crime films
British black-and-white films
Films set in England
Films scored by Eric Spear
1950s English-language films
1950s British films